Melvin Dean Gray (born September 29, 1948) is an American former professional football player who was a wide receiver for the St. Louis Cardinals of the National Football League (NFL) from  1971 to 1982. He attended college at the University of Missouri.

High school
Gray attended Montgomery High School in Santa Rosa, California, the football standout was also a track and field star.  While winning the 100-yard dash at the 1967 CIF California State Meet, Gray set not only the meet record but the National High School record of 9.4 in the event at the time.  His meet record lasted until 1979.

College
He accepted a scholarship to the University of Missouri and became a football and track and field star. Gray was an All-American sprinter and was a Grand Slam winner in the 100-meter dash in 1970, capturing titles at the Texas, Kansas, and Drake relays. Gray was a five-time Big Eight Conference sprint champion, winning the indoor 60-yard dash (1970), and the 100- and 220-yard dashes outdoors in 1969 and 1970. He is the co-holder of the MU records in all three races, with times of 6.0 seconds, 9.2 seconds, and 20.3 seconds, respectively. Gray was also an all-Big Eight performer in 1969 when he caught 25 passes for 705 yards and a school-record nine touchdowns. He held the school record for career receiving yards (1,491) for 20 years and was named to the Mizzou All-Century Team in 1990.

Pro career

In the 1971 NFL Draft, Gray was a sixth-round pick of the St. Louis Cardinals and was selected to four straight Pro Bowls (1974–1977).  Gray was one of the most feared deep threats in the NFL throughout the 1970s. Twenty-eight of his forty-six career touchdown receptions were more than 40 yards long. He was the league co-leader in touchdown receptions in 1975 and averaged almost 19 yards per catch during his career. Gray also caught passes in 121 consecutive games between 1973 and 1982.

Awards

Gray is a member of the University of Missouri Hall of Fame, the St. Louis Sports Hall of Fame, and the Missouri Sports Hall of Fame.

References

External links

1948 births
Living people
American football wide receivers
Missouri Tigers football players
St. Louis Cardinals (football) players
National Conference Pro Bowl players
Sportspeople from Fresno, California
Track and field athletes from California
Oklahoma Outlaws players
Arizona Outlaws players